WSCB (89.9 FM; "The Birthplace") is a student-run campus radio station at Springfield College in Springfield, Massachusetts. It features an eclectic mix of music as well as news and sports talk from a variety of disc jockeys. WSCB's programming comes from students, faculty, and staff on the Springfield College campus.

References

External links
 

SCB
Springfield College (Massachusetts)
Mass media in Springfield, Massachusetts
Radio stations established in 1958
1958 establishments in Massachusetts